Aaron Louis Treadwell, Ph.D. (1866–1947) was a college professor of zoology at Vassar.  He was born at Redding, Connecticut, and educated at Wesleyan University (B.S., 1888; M.S., 1890) and at the University of Chicago (Ph.D., 1898).  He was professor of zoology and geology at Miami University (1891-1900), professor of biology at Vassar (1900–14), and afterwards professor of zoology. In addition to his work in the schools, he was instructor at the Marine Biological Laboratory at Woods Hole.  Treadwell published The Cytogeny of Podarke obscura (1901).  His writings dealt chiefly with annelid systematics and embryonics.

References
 Biographical Etymology of Marine Organism Names

American zoologists
1866 births
People from Redding, Connecticut
Wesleyan University alumni
University of Chicago alumni
1947 deaths
Miami University faculty
Vassar College faculty